4GY is an Australian radio station serving the Gympie region. It was opened in November 1941.

References

Radio stations in Queensland
Radio stations established in 1941
News and talk radio stations in Australia
Classic hits radio stations in Australia
Broadcast Operations Group